Zhanhe District is a district of the city of Pingdingshan, Henan province, China.

Administrative divisions
As 2012, this district is divided to 6 subdistricts, 1 town and 1 township.
Subdistricts

Towns
Beidu

Townships
Caozhen Township

References

County-level divisions of Henan
Pingdingshan